America Bangladesh University or ABU is a name used by several private universities, none of which are recognised by the University Grants Commission of Bangladesh (UCG).

One university was recognised by the UCG, and according to the commission the proper ABU campus was located at 54/1 Progoti Sarani, Baridhara-Nodda, Dhaka-1212, Bangladesh. Several other campuses exist, that appear to be illegal.  iqbal Hossain Bhuiyan, deputy registrar of America Bangladesh University, denied that the illegal campuses were run by ABU. The government cancelled the university's license but it in 2014 was still running under a stay order from a court. The ABU claims on its web page that the High Court have given full clearance to the university on 20 November 2013  and that the unauthorized campuses have been ordered to close.

As of October, 2018 America Bangladesh University is not on the list of private universities at the University Grants Commission web site.

See also
 List of universities in Bangladesh

Footnotes

Private universities in Bangladesh
Educational institutions established in 2002
2002 establishments in Bangladesh